Simon Gray (1936–2008) was an English playwright and memoirist.

Simon Gray may also refer to: 

 Simon B. Gray, American college athletics administrator
 Simon Gray (businessman), British businessman 
 Simon Gray (swimmer) (born 1959), retired British international swimmer

See also 
 Gray Simons (born 1939), American wrestler
 Simon Grayson (born 1969), English football former player